Thomas Taylour, 2nd Marquess of Headfort KP PC (4 May 1787 – 6 December 1870), styled Viscount Headfort from 1795 to 1800 and Earl of Bective from 1800 to 1829, was an Anglo-Irish Whig politician.  He was the Member of Parliament (MP) for Meath from 1812 to 1830.

Headfort was the son of Thomas Taylour, 1st Marquess of Headfort, and his wife Mary (née Quin), and succeeded his father in the marquessate in 1829. In 1831 he was created Baron Kenlis, of Kenlis in the County of Meath, in the Peerage of the United Kingdom, which entitled him to an automatic seat in the House of Lords (his other titles being in the Peerage of Ireland). He was sworn of the Irish Privy Council in 1835 and served in the Whig administration of Lord Melbourne as a Lord-in-waiting (government whip in the House of Lords) from 1837 to 1841. Between 1831 and 1870 Headfort also held the post of Lord Lieutenant of Cavan. He was made a Knight of the Order of St Patrick in 1839.

Lord Headfort first married Olivia, daughter of John Andrew Stevenson, in 1822. At the time of her early death (at the hands of cholera) on 21 July 1834, she left her husband with nine children to mourn her passing. On 6 May 1853, he married Lady Frances Macnaghten, daughter of John Livingstone Martyn and widow of (i) Lieutenant-Colonel James McClintock of the Bombay Army and (ii) Sir William Hay Macnaghten, British Envoy to Afghanistan who was murdered in Kabul in 1841. Headfort died in December 1870, aged 83, and was succeeded in the marquessate by his son from his first marriage, Thomas. Another of his children by his first marriage was the author Virginia Sandars. The second Marchioness of Headfort died in 1878.

References
Kidd, Charles, Williamson, David (editors). Debrett's Peerage and Baronetage (1990 edition). New York: St Martin's Press, 1990.

www.thepeerage.com

External links

1787 births
1870 deaths
Knights of St Patrick
Lord-Lieutenants of Cavan
Members of the Parliament of the United Kingdom for County Meath constituencies (1801–1922)
UK MPs 1812–1818
UK MPs 1818–1820
UK MPs 1820–1826
UK MPs 1826–1830
Members of the Privy Council of Ireland
Thomas
Marquesses of Headfort
Peers of the United Kingdom created by William IV